Arp-Madore 1 is a globular cluster visible in the constellation Horologium, located   away from Earth. It is one of the most distant known globular clusters of the Milky Way galaxy's halo; its distance gives it interest as a test case for gravitational theories. It is named after Halton Arp and Barry F. Madore, who identified it as a distant globular cluster in 1979, using the UK Schmidt Telescope, after previous researchers at the European Southern Observatory had observed its existence but not its classification.

References

External links 
 

Horologium (constellation)
Globular clusters